Caren Jane Rangi  (born ~1967) is a Cook Islands accountant and public servant. She is the first Pacific woman to serve as chair of the Arts Council of New Zealand Toi Aotearoa.

Of Manihiki and Rarotongan descent, Rangi was born in Christchurch, New Zealand. She grew up in Napier suburb of Tamatea, and was educated at Tamatea School, Tamatea Intermediate, and Tamatea High School. She studied for a Bachelor of Business Studies at Massey University before working for the Office of the Controller and Auditor-General. In 2008 she became a consultant, and subsequently worked in a range of governance roles.

Rangi has served on the boards of Te Papa, NZ On Air, and Radio New Zealand. In 2015 she was appointed as a director of the Cook Islands Investment Corporation. From 2015 to 2017 she was National President of PACIFICA, the Pacific women's council. In April 2021 she was appointed as chair the board of the Arts Council of New Zealand Toi Aotearoa.

Honours
In the 2018 Queen's Birthday Honours, Rangi was appointed an Officer of the New Zealand Order of Merit, for services to the Pacific community and governance.

References

Living people
People from Napier, New Zealand
Massey University alumni
Cook Island women
New Zealand accountants
New Zealand public servants
Officers of the New Zealand Order of Merit
Year of birth uncertain
Year of birth missing (living people)